Royal Harwood Frost (25 February 1879 – 11 May 1950) was an American astronomer, born in Salem, Massachusetts to Albinus Finney Frost and Emma Jane Richardson, the fourth son of a family of ten.

He married Caroline Eliza Mayhew with whom he had three daughters (Caroline Frost, Martha Richardson Frost and Barbara Frost) and two sons (Royal Harwood Frost Jr. and William Mayhew Frost).

Frost was an astronomical assistant at the Harvard College Observatory from 1896 to 1908, under the directorship of Edward Charles Pickering. From 1902 to 1905 he worked at the Arequipa station in Peru using the 24-inch f/5.6 Bruce photographic refractor, made by Alvan Clark & Sons and completed in 1893. His observations of nebulae (following DeLisle Stewart) using four-hour plates were published in the Harv. Ann. 60, 179 (1908). He discovered 454 new objects, included in the IC II (Second Index Catalogue of Nebulae Found in the Years 1895 to 1907; with Notes and Corrections to the New General Catalogue and to the Index Catalogue for 1888 to 1894, Mem. Roy. Astron. Soc., Vol. 59, Part 2, p. 105, 1908). When moving the Bruce telescope to Boyden Observatory in Bloemfontein, South Africa in 1926, Harvard offered him a job, but he did not go. Instead he started a dairy farm in Tingo, Peru.

He later returned to Ft. Worth, Texas, to work for an oil company doing accounting. Later still he moved to Shreveport, Louisiana. He is buried in the Forest Park Cemetery at Shreveport, Louisiana.

External links
 Biography
 Genealogy

1879 births
1950 deaths
Harvard University staff
American astronomers
Discoverers of asteroids
People from Fort Worth, Texas
American expatriates in Peru